"Wanted" is a song by Nigerian singer Tiwa Savage from her debut studio album Once Upon a Time (2013). The song was produced by American producer Warren "Oak" Felder and samples the memorable line "out in the streets/they call it murder" from Damian Marley's "Welcome to Jamrock". The Moe Musa-directed music video for "Wanted" was released on 27 May 2014. Its release prompted a huge public backlash across various social networking sites, including Facebook, Twitter and YouTube.

Music video

Background

The accompanying music video for "Wanted" was shot and directed by Moe Musa. It was released on May 27, 2014, and ran for 3 minutes and 31 seconds. In the video, Savage is seen wearing a nude body suit and mimicking the sexual act of fingering. Throughout the video, Savage writhed sensually and performed erotically-charged dance moves. In an interview with The Times, Savage said she released the video at a stage in her life at which she was comfortable with her body. She also said she wanted to explore her life as a woman and target the adult market.

Reception
Cultural reception to the music video was mixed. Critics who opposed the video argued that Nigerian artists shouldn't emulate sexual images often seen in western media at the expense of tarnishing the morality of the Nigerian culture. Conversely, those in support of the video praised its sexual nature and stance on sexual empowerment. Social critic Charles Novia bluntly described the video as “stupid art”, while public figures such as Uti Nwachukwu, Gbemi Olateru Olagbegi, Dr SID and Toolz described it as brilliant.

A writer for The Sun said the video lacks originality, concluding: "Tiwa’s video does not fail because it is raunchy, because she is a married woman in-sistent on living out her fantasies or because of the questionable fashion tastes. It fails because after all the glossy hype, the video is utterly unoriginal, desperately copycat-ish and incredibly boring."

Live performances
In June 2014, Tiwa Savage performed "Wanted" at the  Road to the MAMAs concert alongside her label mates Dr SID, Di'Ja, Korede Bello and Reekado Banks. She also performed the song at the 2014 edition of Africa Unplugged alongside Davido and Diamond Platnumz.

Accolades
"Wanted" earned Tiwa Savage a nomination for Best Vocal Performance (Female) at The Headies 2014.

References

External links

2013 songs
Tiwa Savage songs
Songs written by Tiffany Red
Songs written by Tiwa Savage